Ilembo is an administrative ward in the Mbeya Rural district of the Mbeya Region of Tanzania. In 2016 the Tanzania National Bureau of Statistics report there were 13,440 people in the ward, from 17,391 in 2012.

Villages and hamlets 
The ward has 10 villages, and 48 hamlets.

 Ilembo
 Igwila
 Ijembe
 Ilembo madukani
 Itala
 Mafune
 Manzigula
 Masangati
 Dimbwe
 Ihombe
 Isumbi
 Nsalala
 Sheyo
 Mwala
 Halonje
 Iringa
 Isyasya
 Iyuli
 Mwala Shuleni
 Ndanga
 Pikwi
 Mbawi
 Igamba
 Isela
 Mbawi
 Mbagala
 Itewe
 Iwonde
 Kesalia
 Ujunjulu
 Iyunga
 Iyunga "A"
 Iyunga "B"
 Mbozi
 Msena
 Italazya
 Ibula
 Ilaga
 Kanona
 Lyoto
 Mbana
 Shigamba II
 Itale
 Mpaza
 Msimishe
 Shigamba
 Mwakasita
 Mantenga
 Mwakasita
 Ng'ambi
 Shilungwe
 Shilanga
 Igambo shuleni
 Itigi
 Luswaya
 Majengo
 Mwanda
 Shilanga ofisini

References 

Wards of Mbeya Region